Gordon Murray Smith (born 3 April 1949) is a Scottish former cricketer and educator.

Smith was born at Glasgow in April 1949 and later studied at Jordanhill College. A club cricketer for the West of Scotland Cricket Club, Smith played in three List A one-day matches for Scotland in the 1980 Benson & Hedges Cup, making his debut at Glasgow against Leicestershire in what was Scotland's inaugural List A match; his following two appearances came against Derbyshire at Glasgow, and Lancashire at Old Trafford. As a bowler in the Scottish side, Smith struggled against first-class county opposition, going wicketless in his three matches. Outside of cricket, Smith was by profession a schoolteacher. In 2012, he was president of the West of Scotland Cricket Club.

References

External links

1949 births
Living people
Cricketers from Glasgow
Scottish cricketers